Dorothy 'Georges' Banks was a British writer and artist affiliated with avant-garde circles such as the Rhythm Group at the start of the 20th century. Little is known about her biographical information, though it is believed she often signed her work using the male pseudonym 'Georges Banks.'

Work 
For the 1912 publication 'How Pearl Button Was Kidnapped' by the New Zealand writer Katherine Mansfield, Banks created a caricature of the writer, alongside sketches by her friend Henri Gaudier-Breszka, Othon Friesz and J.D. Fergusson.

According to curator Alicia Foster, Banks and fellow Rhythm artist Jessica Dismorr shared a fascination for modern dance and performance and they both worked as foreign correspondents for a French theatre magazine. Banks wrote the first review for the Ballets Russes in Rhythm, writing about the production Petrouchka composed by Igor Stravinsky. In September 1912, she reviewed the production Salomé featuring the acclaimed dancer Ida Rubinstein.

In 1912–13, sculptor Gaudier-Breszka created a caricature of Banks, which still exists in Kettle's Yard, University of Cambridge.

See also 
 Vorticism

References 

Year of birth missing
Year of death missing
20th-century British women writers